Nausinoe pueritia is a moth in the family Crambidae. It was described by Pieter Cramer in 1780. It is found in India, Sri Lanka, Burma, Malaysia, Thailand and Australia, where it has been recorded from the Northern Territory, Queensland and New South Wales.

References

Moths described in 1780
Spilomelinae